Kima Rumi (Ancash Quechua kima three (kimsa), Quechua rumi stone, "three stones", also spelled Quimarumi) is a mountain in the Cordillera Central in the Andes of Peru which reaches a height of approximately . It is located in the Junín Region, Jauja Province, Canchayllo District, and in the Lima Region, Yauyos Province, Huancaya District.

References 

Mountains of Peru
Mountains of Lima Region
Mountains of Junín Region